Senovo may refer to:

Senovo, Bulgaria, a town in the Vetovo Municipality in northeastern Bulgaria
Senovo, Slovenia, a town in the Krško municipality in eastern Slovenia